The Baptism of Lithuania is an oil on canvas painting by the Polish artist Jan Matejko, executed in 1888. It shows the conversion of Lithuania (then a Grand Duchy) to Christianity and the baptism of the Boyar princes and people before the temple of the pagan god Perkūnas on Holy Saturday 1387. It forms part of the artist's series The History of Civilisation in Poland.

References

External links

Paintings by Jan Matejko
1888 paintings